Stjepan Berislavić (1505 – 1535) was a Hungarian nobleman and titular Despot of Serbia between 1520 and 1535. He was a prominent nobleman in several counties (Syrmia, Vukovar and Požega) of Slavonia, Hungary.

Life

Stjepan Berislavić was member of the Berislavići noble family, from the Požega County (central region of modern Slavonia). He was the elder son of Ivaniš Berislavić (d. 1514), who served as titular Despot of Serbia (1504–1514), and Ban of Jajce (1511–1513).

Stjepan's mother was Jelena Jakšić, a member of the Jakšić noble family, who had previously been married to Jovan Branković, the last Serbian Despot of the Branković dynasty (1496–1502). As Jelena and his first husband had no male issue, the title of Serbian Despot became vacant upon Jovan's death in 1502. When Jelena remarried to Ivaniš Berislavić in 1504, he received the title, from Croato-Hungarian king Vladislaus II (d. 1516), and held it until his death in 1514.

Stjepan was  nine years old when his father died, and thus the title of Serbian Despot was granted to him only in 1520, by  king Louis II (d. 1526). After the Ottoman conquest of Belgrade in 1521, he tried to hold his fortress of Kupinik in Syrmia county, but the region was eventually lost to Ottoman invasion.

After the defeat at the Battle of Mohács (1526), Kingdom of Hungary became divided between two rival fractions; one was led by King Ferdinand Habsburg, while the other was led by John Zápolya, the Duke of Transylvania, who was also proclaimed King. At first, Stjepan Berislavić supported Zapolja (1526), but soon opted for Ferdinand, at the beginning of 1527. Learning of that, Zapolja tried to suppress Stjepan's authority over Serbs by appointing Serbian nobleman Radič Božić as titular Despot of Serbia (1527–1528). In spite of that, Stjepan continued to act as Serbian Despot, and was recognized as such by King Ferdinand. In 1529, Stjepan fell out of Ferdinand's favor and was confined in Buda, but soon escaped.

At that time, Ferdinand's territories in Hungary were invaded again by the Ottomans, who acted as allies of rival king John Zápolya, ruler of the Eastern Hungarian Kingdom. Stjepan decided to join them, and in return received confirmation of his domains. Since 1529, he has controlled frontier regions in Slavonian Posavina, centered in Brod. During 1532 and 1533, he negotiated again with king Ferdinand, but no agreement was reached. In 1535, he came in conflict with Ottoman governor of Bosnia. During the invasion, Stjepan was killed by janissary, and his domain was conquered by the Ottomans.

Ancestors

Annotations
Name: Serbian historiography uses Stefan or Stevan, while Croatian historiography uses Stjepan. In Hungarian historiography, his full name is written as Beriszló István.

References

Sources 

 
 
 
 
 
 
 
 
 
 
 
 
 
 

Berislavić noble family
Despots of Serbia
16th-century Hungarian nobility
16th-century Serbian nobility
16th-century Croatian nobility
History of Slavonia
History of Syrmia
1505 births
1535 deaths